Jobbágyi is a village in Nógrád County, Hungary with 2,132 inhabitants (2014).

Notable person
 The botanist and entomologist Imre Frivaldszky (1799-1870) died in Jobbágyi.

References

Populated places in Nógrád County